Irene Piotrowski, (née Macijauskaitė; July 9, 1941 – August 13, 2020) was a Canadian female track and field athlete, born in Skaudvilė, Lithuania. In 1964, Piotrowski broke the World and Canadian 100 metre record at 11.4 seconds. She competed in the 1964 Olympic Games in the 100 metre and 200 metre. She won a silver medal in the 100 yards  and a bronze in the 220 yard sprints at the 1966 British Empire and Commonwealth Games in Kingston, Jamaica.  She competed in the 1968 Summer Olympics in Mexico City, in the 200 metres, 4x100 metre relay and the 100 metre where she set the Canadian records. She claimed the bronze medal in the women's 100 metres at the 1967 Pan American Games in Winnipeg, Manitoba, Canada, and ran the anchor leg on the 4 x 100 metre relay squad that took the silver medal. She won the Yukon Flour Packing title in 1974, backpacking 500 pounds in 100 feet, and 600 pounds in 50 ft.  She died in 2020 in Los Angeles, California at the age of 79.

References

External links
 

1941 births
2020 deaths
Canadian female sprinters
People from Tauragė District Municipality
Athletes (track and field) at the 1964 Summer Olympics
Athletes (track and field) at the 1966 British Empire and Commonwealth Games
Athletes (track and field) at the 1967 Pan American Games
Athletes (track and field) at the 1968 Summer Olympics
Lithuanian emigrants to Canada
Athletes (track and field) at the 1970 British Commonwealth Games
Olympic track and field athletes of Canada
Commonwealth Games silver medallists for Canada
Commonwealth Games bronze medallists for Canada
Commonwealth Games medallists in athletics
Pan American Games silver medalists for Canada
Pan American Games bronze medalists for Canada
Pan American Games medalists in athletics (track and field)
Medalists at the 1967 Pan American Games
Olympic female sprinters
Medallists at the 1966 British Empire and Commonwealth Games